This was the first edition of the tournament.

Adam Pavlásek won the tournament, defeating Hans Podlipnik Castillo in the final, 6–2, 3–6, 6–3.

Seeds

  Blaž Kavčič (first round)
  Aleksandr Nedovyesov (first round, retired)
  Facundo Argüello (first round)
  André Ghem (semifinals)
  Norbert Gombos (semifinals)
  Gerald Melzer (second round)
  Jozef Kovalík (first round)
  Uladzimir Ignatik (quarterfinals, retired)

Draw

Finals

Top half

Bottom half

External links
 Main Draw
 Qualifying Draw

Poprad-Tatry ATP Challenger Tour - Singles
2015 Singles